Caitlin Mary Collins (born 22 July 1988) is an Australian politician. She has been a Labor member of the Western Australian Legislative Assembly since the 2021 state election, representing Hillarys. Prior to her election, Collins taught politics and history at local schools.  

Previously, she contested the 2017 state election in then-Premier Colin Barnett's seat of Cottesloe.

As the Member for Hillarys Collins has worked hard to deliver real outcomes for local residents. Her key priorities include upgrading local primary and secondary schools, protecting the character of the area, improving road safety and increasing access to public transport.

Personal life
Born in Aberdeen, Scotland on 22 July 1988, Collins migrated to Australia, arriving in Victoria in 1992 and then moving to Perth, Western Australia in 1996. She graduated from the University of Notre Dame in 2010 with a BA, majoring in history, politics and international relations. She lives in Padbury with her partner Jack, and their dog Lenny.

Early career 
Collins studied history, politics and international relations at Notre Dame in Fremantle then pursued a teaching qualification in order to share her passion for civics.

She has taught extensively in India, Colombia and Vietnam and completed a parliamentary internship in Ireland. Her experiences abroad instilled a recognition of the transformative power of education and imparted a deep appreciation of Australian democracy. In her inaugural speech, she raised the issues of climate action, youth mental health and the power of education.

Political career 
Collins was endorsed as Labor candidate for the seat of Hillarys in July 2020. In her election campaigns, she received mentoring from New South Wales politician, Rose Jackson, through EMILY's List Australia.

At the 2021 election Collins gained one of the largest swings in the entire state, 19.3% as was elected as the first Labor Member to Hillarys since Pamela Beggs held the predecessor seat of Whitfords from 1983-1993.

Collins is the 100th woman elected to the Western Australian Parliament being sworn in 100 years after the election of Edith Cowan, the first woman elected to any Parliament in Australia.

Parliamentary appointments 
Collins was appointed as a member of the Education and Health Standing Committee from 12 May 2021 and as an Acting Speaker of the Legislative Assembly from 11 May 2022.

Election Results

2021 State Election

2017 State Election

References

Living people
1988 births 
Australian Labor Party members of the Parliament of Western Australia
Members of the Western Australian Legislative Assembly
Women members of the Western Australian Legislative Assembly
21st-century Australian politicians
21st-century Australian women politicians

People from Aberdeen
University of Notre Dame Australia alumni